Jaime Jerónimo das Mercês (born 27 September 1963), known simply as Jaime, is a Portuguese former footballer who played as a midfielder.

Club career
Jaime was born in Cova da Piedade, Almada. After starting out professionally at lowly Amora FC, then in the Primeira Liga, he signed at the age of 20 with Lisbon-based C.F. Os Belenenses, helping it promote from the Segunda Liga in his first season and remaining a nuclear first-team member the following years, making more than 250 competitive appearances. He helped to a Taça de Portugal 2–1 final win against neighbours S.L. Benfica in 1989 and, earlier that campaign, participated in the elimination of UEFA Cup holders Bayer 04 Leverkusen (2–0 on aggregate).

In 1992, Jaime joined Vitória de Setúbal of the second division, helping them return to the top flight. Subsequently, entering his 30s, he resumed his career in the second and third tiers, incidentally finishing his career at his first club Amora at nearly 38.

International career
Jaime earned nine caps for Portugal, eight of those coming after the 1986 FIFA World Cup as practically the entire squad had defected the national team following the Saltillo Affair. His debut came on 12 October 1985, in a 3–2 home victory over Malta during the qualifying stages for that tournament.

References

External links

1963 births
Living people
Sportspeople from Setúbal District
Portuguese footballers
Association football midfielders
Primeira Liga players
Liga Portugal 2 players
Segunda Divisão players
Amora F.C. players
C.F. Os Belenenses players
Vitória F.C. players
A.D. Ovarense players
C.D. Beja players
Atlético Clube de Portugal players
Portugal youth international footballers
Portugal under-21 international footballers
Portugal international footballers